Operation Pagoda was launched on 16 May 1966 by the Rhodesian Government in response to the murder of a farmer, Johannes Viljoen, and his wife at their farm just north of Hartley. 1 Commando of the Rhodesian Light Infantry and units of the British South Africa Police were deployed to kill or capture the terrorists.

The BSAP ended up doing most of the work in Operation Pagoda because the local police commanders were reluctant at this time to sign control over to the army. The RLI was given little opportunity to act.

References

Biography

Pagoda
Pagoda
1966 in Rhodesia